The Quincy Shipbuilders were a minor league baseball team based in Quincy, Massachusetts in 1933. The Quincy Shipbuilders briefly played as members of the Class B level New England League, relocating during the 1933 season.

The Quincy Shipbuilders were a minor league affiliate of the Detroit Tigers.

History
Minor league baseball began in Quincy, Massachusetts in 1933. The Quincy "Shipbuilders" became charter members of the six–team Class B level New England League. The Shipbuilders were joined by the Attleboro Burros, Lowell Lauriers, New Bedford Whalers, Taunton Blues and Worcester Chiefs in the 1933 reformed league play, which began on May 17, 1933.

The Quincy use of the "Shipbuilders" moniker corresponds to local industry and history. Quincy, Massachusetts was home to the Fore River Shipyard and other ship building related companies in the era.

On June 6, 1933, after beginning league play, the Quincy Shipbuilders franchise relocated. Quincy had compiled a 12–6 record when the franchise relocated to Nashua, New Hampshire, where the team became the Nashua Millionaires. Nashua moved to Brockton, Massachusetts on August 8, 1933, where the team finished the season as the Brockton Shoemakers. After compiling a 16–41 record after leaving Quincy, the team placed 5th and finished with an overall record of 28–47, playing under managers Hal Weafer, Billy Flynn and Paul Wolff in the three locations. The Quincy/Nashua/Brockton team finished 22.0 games behind the 1st place New Bedford Whalers (58–33) in the final 1933 League standings.

The New England League folded after the 1933 season. When the league resumed minor league play in 1946, Quincy did not field a franchise.

It was referenced that in 1944, a Quincy Shipbuilders team played in a semi–pro version of the New England League.

Quincy, Massachusetts has not hosted another minor league team.

The ballpark
The 1933 Quincy Shipbuilders were noted to have hosted minor league home games at Fore River Field. Reportedly, fans passed a hat to pay admission. The park is still in use today as a public park with ballfields. It is located on Beechwood Street, Quincy, Massachusetts.

Year–by–year records

Notable alumni
Hal Weafer (1933, MGR)

References

Defunct minor league baseball teams
Professional baseball teams in Massachusetts
Defunct baseball teams in Massachusetts
Baseball teams established in 1933
Baseball teams disestablished in 1933
Detroit Tigers minor league affiliates
Quincy, Massachusetts
New England League teams